Labetalol is a medication used to treat high blood pressure and in long term management of angina. This includes essential hypertension, hypertensive emergencies, and hypertension of pregnancy. In essential hypertension it is generally less preferred than a number of other blood pressure medications. It can be given by mouth or by injection into a vein.

Common side effects include low blood pressure with standing, dizziness, feeling tired, and nausea. Serious side effects may include low blood pressure, liver problems, heart failure, and bronchospasm. Use appears safe in the latter part of pregnancy and it is not expected to cause problems during breastfeeding. It works by blocking the activation of β-receptors and α-receptors.

Labetalol was patented in 1966 and came into medical use in 1977. It is available as a generic medication. In 2020, it was the 210th most commonly prescribed medication in the United States, with more than 2million prescriptions.

Medical uses
Labetalol is effective in the management of hypertensive emergencies, postoperative hypertension, pheochromocytoma-associated hypertension, and rebound hypertension from beta blocker withdrawal.

It has a particular indication in the treatment of pregnancy-induced hypertension which is commonly associated with pre-eclampsia.

It is also used as an alternative in the treatment of severe hypertension.

Special populations 
Pregnancy: studies in lab animals showed no harm to the baby. However, a comparable well-controlled study has not been performed in pregnant women.

Nursing: breast milk has been shown to contain small amounts of labetalol (0.004% original dose). Prescribers should be cautious in the use of labetalol for nursing mothers.

Pediatric: no studies have established safety or usefulness in this population.

Geriatric: the elderly are more likely to experience dizziness when taking labetalol. Labetalol should be dosed with caution in the elderly and counseled on this side effect.

Side effects

Common 
 Neurologic: headache (2%), dizziness (11%)
 Gastrointestinal: nausea (6%), dyspepsia (3%)
 Cholinergic: nasal congestion (3%), ejaculation failure (2%)
 Respiratory: dyspnea (2%)
 Other: fatigue (5%), vertigo (2%), orthostatic hypotension

Low blood pressure with standing is more severe and more common with IV formulation (58% vs 1%) and is often the reason larger doses of the oral formulation cannot be used.

Rare 
 Fever
 Muscle cramps
 Dry eyes
 Heart block
 Hyperkalemia
 Hepatotoxicity
 Drug eruption similar to lichen planus
 Hypersensitivity - which may result in a lethal respiratory distress

Contraindications
Labetalol is contraindicated in people with overt cardiac failure, greater-than-first-degree heart block, severe bradycardia, cardiogenic shock, severe hypotension, anyone with a history of obstructive airway disease including asthma, and those with hypersensitivity to the drug.

Chemistry
The minimum requirement for adrenergic agents is a primary or secondary amine separated from a substituted benzene ring by one or two carbons. This configuration results in strong agonist activity. As the size of the substituent attached to the amine becomes greater, particularly with respect to a t-butyl group, then the molecule typically is found to have receptor affinity without intrinsic activity, and is, therefore, an antagonist. Labetalol, with its 1-methyl-3-phenylpropyl substituted amine, is greater in size relative to a t-butyl group and therefore acts predominantly as an antagonist. The overall structure of labetalol is very polar. This was created by substituting the isopropyl group in the standard beta-blocker structure with an aralkyl group, including a carboxamide group on the meta position, and by adding a hydroxyl group on the para position.

Labetalol has two chiral carbons and consequently exists as four stereoisomers. Two of these isomers, the (S,S)- and (R,S)- forms are inactive. The third, the (S,R)-isomer, is a powerful α1 blocker. The fourth isomer, the (R,R)-isomer which is also known as dilevalol, is a mixed nonselective β blocker and selective α1 blocker. Labetalol is typically given as a racemic mixture to achieve both alpha and beta receptor blocking activity.

Labetalol acts by blocking alpha and beta adrenergic receptors, resulting in decreased peripheral vascular resistance without significant alteration of heart rate or cardiac output.

The β:α antagonism of labetalol is approximately 3:1.

It is chemically designated in International Union of Pure and Applied Chemistry (IUPAC) nomenclature as 2-hydroxy-5-[1-hydroxy-2-[(1-methyl-3-phenylpropyl)amino]ethyl]benzamide monohydrochloride.

Pharmacology

Mechanism of action 
Labetalol's dual alpha and beta adrenergic antagonism has different physiological effects in short- and long-term situations. In short-term, acute situations, labetalol decreases blood pressure by decreasing systemic vascular resistance with little effect on stroke volume, heart rate and cardiac output. During long-term use, labetalol can reduce heart rate during exercise while maintaining cardiac output by an increase in stroke volume.

Labetalol is a dual alpha (α1) and beta (β1/β2) adrenergic receptor blocker and competes with other Catecholamines for binding to these sites. Its action on these receptors are potent and reversible. Labetalol is highly selective for postsynaptic alpha1- adrenergic, and non-selective for beta-adrenergic receptors. It is about equipotent in blocking beta1- and beta2- receptors.

The amount of alpha to beta blockade depends on whether labetalol is administered orally or intravenously (IV). Orally, the ratio of alpha to β blockade is 1:3. Intravenously, alpha to β blockade ratio is 1:7. Thus, the labetalol can be thought to be a beta-blocker with some alpha-blocking effects. By comparison, labetalol is a weaker β-blocker than propranolol, and has a weaker affinity for alpha-receptors compared to Phentolamine.

Labetalol possesses intrinsic sympathomimetic activity. In particular, it is a partial agonist at beta2- receptors located in the vascular smooth muscle. Labetalol relaxes vascular smooth muscle by a combination of this partial beta2- agonism and through alpha1- blockade. Overall, this vasodilatory effect can decrease blood pressure.

Similar to local anesthetics and sodium channel blocking antiarrhythmics, labetalol also has membrane stabilizing activity. By decreasing sodium entry, labetalol decreases action potential firing and thus has local anesthetic activity.

Physiological action 
The physiological effects of labetalol when administered acutely (intravenously) are not predictable solely by their receptor blocking effect, i.e. blocking beta1- receptors should decrease heart rate, but labetalol does not. When labetalol is given in acute situations, it decreases the peripheral vascular resistance and systemic blood pressure while having little effect on the heart rate, cardiac output and stroke volume, despite its alpha1-, beta1- and beta2- blocking mechanism. These effects are mainly seen when the person is in the upright position.

Long term labetalol use also has different effects from other beta-blocking drugs. Other beta-blockers, such as propranolol, persistently reduce cardiac output during exercise. The peripheral vascular resistance decreases when labetalol is first administered. Continuous labetalol use further decreases peripheral vascular resistance. However, during exercise, cardiac output remains the same due to a compensatory mechanism that increases stroke volume. Thus, labetalol is able to reduce heart rate during exercise while maintaining cardiac output by the increase in stroke volume.

Pharmacokinetics 
Labetalol, in animal models, was found to cross the blood-brain-barrier in only negligible amounts.

History 
Labetalol was the first drug created that combined both alpha- and beta- adrenergic receptor blocking properties. It was created to potentially fix the compensatory reflex issue that occurred when blocking a single receptor subtype, i.e. vasoconstriction after blocking beta-receptors or tachycardia after blocking alpha receptors. Because the reflex from blocking the single receptor subtypes acted to prevent the lowering of blood pressure, it was postulated that weak blocking of both alpha- and beta- receptors could work together to decrease blood pressure.

References

External links
 
 

Alpha-1 blockers
Beta blockers
CYP2D6 inhibitors
Hepatotoxins
Peripherally selective drugs
Phenylethanolamines
Salicylamides
Wikipedia medicine articles ready to translate